Michael Joseph Ryan is an American biologist, author, Clark Hubbs Regents Professor in Zoology in the Department of Integrative Biology at the University of Texas at Austin, and Senior Research Associate at the Smithsonian Tropical Research Institute in Panama. He is considered to be a prominent expert in the fields of sexual selection and animal communication. Ryan has authored over 300 peer-reviewed scientific articles and publications on the evolution and mechanisms of animal behavior. His book The Túngara Frog: A Study of Sexual Selection and Communication is regarded as a classic in his field. He lives in Austin, Texas.

Bibliography

</ref>

Notable Research Publications

References

American biologists
American zoologists
University of Texas at Austin faculty
Living people
Year of birth missing (living people)
Rutgers University alumni
Cornell University alumni